The Men's 50 metre breaststroke competition at the 2017 World Championships was held on 25 and 26 July 2017.

Records
Prior to the competition, the existing world and championship records were as follows.

The following new records were set during this competition.

Results

Heats
The heats were held on 25 July at 09:30.

Swim-off

Semifinals
The semifinals were held on 25 July at 18:11.

Semifinal 1

Semifinal 2

Final
The final was held on 26 July at 18:17.

References

Men's 50 metre breaststroke